Mark or Marc Anthony or Antony may refer to:

People

Romans
 Marcus Antonius (orator) (died 87 BC), celebrated orator, who was consul in 99 BC, and grandfather of the triumvir
 Marcus Antonius Creticus (died c. 70 BC), father of the triumvir; as praetor in 74 BC he was defeated by the Cretans, earning the surname Creticus
 Mark Antony (83–30 BC), one of Caesar's generals, famous for his eulogy of Julius Caesar and his romance with Cleopatra, formed the "second triumvirate" with Octavian and Lepidus
 Marcus Antonius Antyllus (47–30 BC), son of the triumvir, who nicknamed him Antyllus; he was put to death by Octavian after the battle of Actium

Modern people
 Mark Anthony (Royal Navy officer) (1786–1867), sailor present at Battle of Trafalgar
 Mark Anthony, a member of the 1980s rock band Chameleon
 Marc Anthony Donais (born 1966), better known as Ryan Idol, a gay pornographic and general theater actor
 Mark Anthony (writer) (born 1966), American author 
 Marc Anthony (born 1968), American singer-songwriter
 Marc Anthony (album)
Mark Anthony Morales (born 1968), American rapper using the stage name Prince Markie Dee
 Mark Anthony (DJ), Canadian DJ and music producer
 Marc Anthony (footballer) (born 1978), Scottish association football player
 Mark Anthony (judoka) (born 1989), Australian judoka

Characters
 Mark Antony (Rome character), a fictional version of the historical Marcus Antonius
 Marc Antony and Pussyfoot, animated cartoon characters

Other
 Mark Antony (film), a 2000 Malayalam language film

See also
 Marc Antoine (disambiguation)
 Marcus Antonius (disambiguation)
 Marco Antônio (disambiguation)
 Henry Mark Anthony (1817–1886), Victorian landscape painter

Anthony, Mark